Berthold Allan Couldwell Hall (29 March 1908 – 1983), commonly known as Allan Hall, was an English professional footballer who played for Park Labour, Doncaster Rovers, Middlesbrough, Bradford City, Lincoln City, Tottenham Hotspur, Blackpool and Gainsborough Trinity.

Football career 
Hall began his career at non-League team Park Labour. In 1926 he joined Doncaster Rovers and made 30 appearances and scored 22 goals. The centre forward went on to have spells at Middlesbrough, Bradford City, Lincoln City, Tottenham Hotspur  and Blackpool.

At Blackpool, he scored five goals in his eight league appearances during the 1933–34 campaign. He found the net in his second appearance for the club, in a 1–1 draw with Bolton Wanderers at Bloomfield Road on 24 March. In the following game, a 4–2 home victory over Southampton he scored once. Hall scored two goals in the return match against the Saints three days later, which the hosts won, before scoring his fifth in the next game, a 1–1 draw with Plymouth Argyle at Bloomfield Road.

The following season, 1934–35, he scored four goals in eight league appearances.

Hall finished his career with Gainsborough Trinity.

References 

1908 births
1983 deaths
Footballers from Sheffield
English footballers
English Football League players
Doncaster Rovers F.C. players
Middlesbrough F.C. players
Bradford City A.F.C. players
Lincoln City F.C. players
Tottenham Hotspur F.C. players
Blackpool F.C. players
Gainsborough Trinity F.C. players
Association football forwards
People from Stocksbridge